Jan Nattier is an American scholar of Mahāyana Buddhism.

Early life and education
She earned her PhD in Inner Asian and Altaic Studies from Harvard University (1988), and subsequently taught at the University of Hawaii (1988-1990), Stanford University (1990-1992), and Indiana University (1992–2005).  She then worked as a research professor at the International Research Institute for Advanced Buddhology, Soka University (2006–2010) before retiring from her position there and beginning a series of visiting professorships at various universities in the U.S.

Career
Nattier is one of a group of scholars who have substantially revised views of the early development of Mahāyana Buddhism in the last 20 years. They have in common their attention to and re-evaluation of early Chinese translations of texts.

Her first notable contribution was a book based on her PhD thesis which looked at the Chinese Doctrine of the Three Ages with a focus on the third i.e. Mofa or Age of Dharma Decline. She showed that the latter was a Chinese development with no India parallel. The translation and study of the Ugraparipṛcca published as A Few Good Men: The Bodhisattva Path according to The Inquiry of Ugra (Ugraparipṛcchā) in 2003 also contained an extended essay on working with ancient Buddhist texts, particularly in Chinese.

Nattier's notable articles include a study of the Akṣobhyavūhya Pure Land texts, which asserts the early importance of this strand of Mahāyāna ideology; an evaluation of early Chinese Translations of Buddhist texts and the issue of attribution (which summarises several earlier articles on the subject); and a detailed re-examination of the origins of the Heart Sutra (1992), which proposes that the sutra was composed in China.

Private life

Nattier was married to John R. McRae (1947-2011), a professor and researcher who specialized in the study of Chinese Chan Buddhism and was the author of The Northern School and the Formation of Early Chan Buddhism (University of Hawai`i Press, 1986) and Seeing through Zen: Encounter, Transformation, and Genealogy in Chinese Chan Buddhism (University of California Press, 2003).

Select bibliography
Works in addition to those mentioned below in the "Sources" section.

References

Sources

External links
 Jan Nattier at Academia.edu

American Buddhist studies scholars
Harvard University alumni
Living people
Year of birth missing (living people)